Petar Petrov (born 16 October 1974) is a Bulgarian weightlifter. He competed in the men's featherweight event at the 1996 Summer Olympics.

References

1974 births
Living people
Bulgarian male weightlifters
Olympic weightlifters of Bulgaria
Weightlifters at the 1996 Summer Olympics
Sportspeople from Sliven